The 2012 Texas Tennis Open was a tennis tournament played on outdoor hard courts. It was the second edition of the tournament. It was classified as one of the WTA International tournaments of the 2012 WTA Tour. It took place in Dallas, United States from 17 to 24 August 2012.

Singles main-draw entrants

Seeds

 1 Seedings are based on the rankings of August 13, 2012

Other entrants
The following players received wildcards into the singles main draw
  Jarmila Gajdošová
  Bojana Jovanovski
  Yanina Wickmayer

The following players received entry from the qualifying draw:
  Eugenie Bouchard 
  Casey Dellacqua
  Mirjana Lučić
  Pauline Parmentier

The following player entry as lucky loser:
  Emily Webley-Smith

Withdrawals
  Angelique Kerber (left shoulder injury)
  Sabine Lisicki (left abdominal sprain)
  Monica Niculescu (hand injury)
  Ksenia Pervak
  Urszula Radwańska

Retirements
  Kiki Bertens (right abdominal injury)
  Peng Shuai (right shoulder injury)

Doubles main-draw entrants

Seeds

1 Rankings are as of August 13, 2012

Other entrants
The following pairs received wildcards into the doubles main draw:
  Roxanne Ellison /  Sierra Ellison
  Emily Harman /  Simone Kalhorn
The following pair received entry as alternates:
  Eugenie Bouchard /  Aleksandra Wozniak

Withdrawals
  Kiki Bertens (right abdominal injury)

Champions

Singles

 Roberta Vinci def.  Jelena Janković, 7–5, 6–3

Doubles

 Marina Erakovic /  Heather Watson def.  Līga Dekmeijere /  Irina Falconi, 6–3, 6–0

External links

Official Website

Texas Tennis Open
Texas Tennis Open